Galileoana is a genus of beetles in the family Cerambycidae. It is monotypic, being represented by the single species Galileoana opaca. It is endemic to Tamaulipas, Mexico.

References

Prioninae